This is a list of notable events in music that took place in the year 1962.

Specific locations
1962 in British music
1962 in Norwegian music

Specific genres
1962 in country music
1962 in jazz

Events
January 1 – The Beatles and Brian Poole and the Tremeloes both audition at Decca Records in London which has the option of signing one group only. The Beatles are rejected, mainly as they come from Liverpool and the others are Dagenham-based, nearer London.
January 5 – The first album on which The Beatles play, My Bonnie, credited to "Tony Sheridan and the Beat Brothers" (recorded last June in Hamburg and produced by Bert Kaempfert), is released by Polydor.
January 24 – Brian Epstein signs on to manage The Beatles.
February 16 – Conductor Bruno Walter, the day before his death, ends his last letter with: "Despite all the dark experiences of today I am still confident that Palestrina will remain. The work has all the elements of immortality".
March 18 – The 7th Eurovision Song Contest, held at Villa Louvigny in Luxembourg City, is won by France with the song "Un premier amour", performed by Isabelle Aubret.
March 19 – Bob Dylan releases his debut album, Bob Dylan, in the United States, featuring mostly folk standards.
April 6 – New York Philharmonic concert of April 6, 1962: Leonard Bernstein causes controversy with his remarks before a concert featuring Glenn Gould with the New York Philharmonic, when he (Bernstein) announces that although he disagrees with Gould's slow tempi in Brahms' Piano Concerto No. 1, he finds Gould's ideas fascinating and will conduct the piece anyway. Bernstein's action receives a withering review from The New York Times music critic Harold C. Schonberg.
April 7 – Mick Jagger and Keith Richards meet Brian Jones at The Ealing Club, a blues club in London.
April 10 – Former Beatle Stuart Sutcliffe dies from cerebral paralysis caused by a brain hemorrhage in Hamburg, Germany.
April 12 – A recording is made of Bob Dylan's concert at the Town Hall, in New York City by Columbia Records. (Columbia eventually release the recording of "Tomorrow is a Long Time" from this concert.)
April 24 – Bob Dylan begins recording The Freewheelin' Bob Dylan in New York.
May 29 – The 4th Annual Grammy Awards are held in Chicago, Los Angeles and New York. Henry Mancini wins the most awards with five, including Record of the Year and Song of the Year for his song "Moon River". Judy Garland's Judy at Carnegie Hall wins Album of the Year, while Peter Nero wins Best New Artist.
June 6 – The Beatles play their first session at EMI's Abbey Road Studios in London.
June 19 – The film version of the musical The Music Man is released to theaters by Warner Bros.
August 2 – Robert Allen Zimmerman legally changes his name to Bob Dylan in the New York Supreme Court.
August 16 – The Beatles fire drummer Pete Best and replace him with Ringo Starr.
August 17 – Instrumental Telstar, written and produced by Joe Meek for English band The Tornados, is released in the UK. The song will eventually be the first song by a British group ever to reach the top spot on the Billboard Top 100 in the United States, proving to be a precursor to the British Invasion.
August 18 – The Beatles play their first live engagement with the line-up of John, Paul, George and Ringo, at Hulme Hall, Port Sunlight on the Wirral Peninsula.
August 20 – Albert Grossman becomes Bob Dylan's manager.
August 23 – John Lennon marries Cynthia Powell in an unpublicised register office ceremony at Mount Pleasant, Liverpool.
September 21 – New Musical Express, the British music magazine, publishes a story about two 13-year-old schoolgirls, Sue and Mary, releasing a disc on Decca and adds "A Liverpool group, The Beatles, have recorded 'Love Me Do' for Parlophone Records, set for October 5 release."
September 22 – Bob Dylan appears for the first time at Carnegie Hall in New York City as part of a hootenanny including the first public performance of "A Hard Rain's a-Gonna Fall".
September 23 – Opening concert at the New York Philharmonic's new home, Philharmonic Hall at Lincoln Center for the Performing Arts, conducted by Leonard Bernstein and broadcast live on television across the United States by NBC. The opening work, Aaron Copland's specially commissioned Connotations, sends "shock waves through the world of music". Other commissions featured include Darius Milhaud's Overture Philharmonique and Samuel Barber's Andromache's Farewell for soprano and orchestra. The following day, John Browning premières Barber's Piano Concerto at the venue and on October 4 William Schuman's Symphony No. 8 is premièred here.
October 5 – The Beatles' first single in their own right, "Love Me Do"/"P.S. I Love You", is released in the UK on EMI's Parlophone label.
October 14 – Italian tenor Sergio Franchi makes his American TV debut on The Ed Sullivan Show.
October 17 – The Beatles make their first televised appearance, on Granada television's local news programme People and Places.
October 20 – Peter, Paul and Mary's self-titled debut album reaches No. 1 on the Billboard 200 album chart.
October 21 – Sergio Franchi makes his American concert debut at Carnegie Hall (sans microphone), promoted by Sol Hurok.
November 11
Ken Russell's film Elgar is shown in BBC Television's Monitor series in the United Kingdom.
Joan Baez has all of her first three albums on the Billboard charts, on their way to Gold status.
Two Pete Seeger classic songs reach the Billboard pop charts:
"Where Have All the Flowers Gone" recorded by The Kingston Trio reaches No. 21.
"If I Had a Hammer", recorded by Peter, Paul and Mary, reaches No. 10.
The first American Folk Blues Festival, initiated by German promoters, tours Europe; artists include Sonny Terry, Brownie McGhee and T-Bone Walker. Its only UK date, 21 October at the Free Trade Hall, Manchester, is influential on the British R&B scene, with the audience including Mick Jagger, Keith Richards and Brian Jones of The Rolling Stones with Jimmy Page, Paul Jones, John Mayall and other musicians, and with a second show filmed and shown on Independent Television.
Georges Auric becomes director of the Opéra National de Paris.
André Hodeir's book, Since Debussy, makes controversial claims about the importance of Jean Barraqué as a composer.
José Manuel Calderón becomes the first Dominican musician to record bachata, at the Radiotelevisión Dominicana studios.
The Spokane Philharmonic orchestra becomes the Spokane Symphony.
Dalida is named Calabrian Citizen of Honour and receives the Radio Monte Carlo Oscar with Johnny Hallyday.
Paul & Paula make their first appearance together while attending Howard Payne College in Brownwood, Texas.
The Mashed Potato is a popular dance craze, with several songs based around the style.
Lou Harrison visits Taiwan; on his return he forms, with William Colvig, Richard Dee and Lily Chin, the first American ensemble to play traditional Chinese music.
Sergio Franchi is signed to an RCA Red Seal recording contract in London by Norman Luboff.

Bands formed
Booker T. & the MG's
Herman's Hermits
The Rolling Stones
The Trashmen
Question Mark and the Mysterians
The Routers

Albums released
Adam Faith – Adam Faith
After Hours – Joni James
Alice Faye Sings Her Famous Movie Hits – Alice Faye
Along Comes Ruth – Ruth Brown
All Aboard the Blue Train – Johnny Cash
All Alone – Frank Sinatra
All the Sad Young Men – Anita O'Day
Baby It's You – The Shirelles
Bashin': The Unpredictable Jimmy Smith – Jimmy Smith
Because You're Mine – Keely Smith
The Best of Ball, Barber And Bilk – Kenny Ball, Chris Barber, and Acker Bilk
The Best of Irving Berlin's Songs from Mr. President – Perry Como with Kaye Ballard and Sandy Stewart
The Best of Julie – Julie London
The Best of Sam Cooke – Sam Cooke
Bewitching-Lee – Peggy Lee
Big Band Percussion – Ted Heath and His Music
Big Band Specials – June Christy
Billy Rose's Jumbo – Soundtrack
Blues Cross Country – Peggy Lee
Bobby Vee Meets the Crickets – Bobby Vee and The Crickets
A Bobby Vee Recording Session – Bobby Vee
Bobby Vee's Golden Greats – Bobby Vee
Bob Dylan – Bob Dylan (debut album)
Bo Diddley – Bo Diddley
Bo Diddley & Company – Bo Diddley
Bo Diddley's a Twister – Bo Diddley
Bobby Darin Sings Ray Charles – Bobby Darin
Bouquet of Roses – Les Paul and Mary Ford
The Bridge - Sonny Rollins
Buddy and Soul – Buddy Greco
Bursting Out with the All–Star Big Band! – Oscar Peterson
By Request – Perry Como
Cafrune – Jorge Cafrune
Cal Tjader Plays Harold Arlen – Cal Tjader
Cal Tjader Plays the Contemporary Music of Mexico and Brazil – Cal Tjader
The Cannonball Adderley Sextet in New York – Cannonball Adderley Sextet
Cannonball in Europe! – Cannonball Adderley
Cha Cha de Amor – Dean Martin
Cherokeely Swings – Keely Smith
Chuck Berry Twist – Chuck Berry
The Classic Della – Della Reese
Close Up In Swing – Erroll Garner
Coltrane – John Coltrane
Come Waltz with Me – Steve Lawrence
Comin' Home Baby – Mel Tormé
Dance with Ike & Tina Turner's Kings of Rhythm – Kings of Rhythm
Danny Boy and Other Songs I Love to Sing – Andy Williams
Dear Lonely Hearts – Nat King Cole
Del Shannon – Del Shannon
Dinah '62 – Dinah Washington
Dino: Italian Love Songs – Dean Martin
Dino Latino – Dean Martin
Dizzy on the French Riviera – Dizzy Gillespie
Don't Go in the Lion's Cage Tonight – Julie Andrews
Don't Mess with Tess – Teresa Brewer
Don't Worry 'Bout Me – Billy Eckstine
Drinking Again – Dinah Washington
Duet – Doris Day with André Previn
Dynamite! – Ike & Tina Turner
The Electrifying Aretha Franklin – Aretha Franklin
Ella Swings Brightly with Nelson – Ella Fitzgerald
Ella Swings Gently with Nelson – Ella Fitzgerald
The Fabulous Hits of Dinah Shore – Dinah Shore
The First Family – Vaughn Meader
First Time Out – Clare Fischer
Folklore – Jorge Cafrune
For Those Who Think Young – Joanie Sommers
For Twisters Only – Chubby Checker
French Style – Dean Martin
Full House – Wes Montgomery
The Garland Touch – Judy Garland
The Gift of Love – Jack Jones
Girls! Girls! Girls! (soundtrack) – Elvis Presley
Go – Dexter Gordon
Go On Home – Patti Page
Golden Age of Donegan – Lonnie Donegan
Gospel Time – Ruth Brown
Great Motion Picture Themes – Various Artists
Hancock – Tony Hancock
Hello Young Lovers – Nancy Wilson
High Flying – Lambert, Hendricks & Ross
Hits Of The Rockin' 50s – Bobby Vee
Horn A-Plenty – Al Hirt
Howlin' Wolf – Howlin' Wolf
Howling Wolf Sings the Blues – Howlin' Wolf (released, recorded 1951–52)
Hymns from the Heart – Johnny Cash
I Cry by Night – Kay Starr
I Feel a Song Coming On – Joni James
I Left My Heart In San Francisco – Tony Bennett
I Wanna Be Loved – Dinah Washington
I'm Your Girl – Joni James
In Love – Dinah Washington
In Other Words – Petula Clark
India's Most Distinguished Musician in Concert – Ravi Shankar
Instant Party! – Everly Brothers
It's Trad, Dad! (OST) – Various Artists
I've Got a Lot of Livin' to Do – Jack Jones
Jazz Samba – Stan Getz and Charlie Byrd
Jazz Workshop Revisited – Cannonball Adderley
Let's Talk About Love – Joanie Sommers
Joan Baez in Concert – Joan Baez
Johnny Get Angry – Joanie Sommers
Jorge Cafrune – Jorge Cafrune
Just Plain Country – Kay Starr
Lena...Lovely and Alive – Lena Horne
Lena on the Blue Side – Lena Horne
Let's Face the Music – Shirley Bassey with the Nelson Riddle Orchestra
Let's Go! with The Routers – The Routers
Let's Love – Buddy Greco
Let's Talk About Love – Joanie Sommers
Linger Awhile – Vic Damone
Live at the Diplomat – Damita Jo
The Lively Ones – Vic Damone
Love Letters – Julie London
Love Makes the World Go 'Round – Anna Maria Alberghetti
Marion Montgomery Swings for Winners and Losers – Marion Montgomery
Matt Monro – Matt Monro
Miles Davis at Carnegie Hall – Miles Davis
A Million Dollars' Worth Of Twang Volume 2 – Duane Eddy
Modern Sounds in Country and Western Music – Ray Charles
Modern Sounds in Country and Western Music Volume Two – Ray Charles
Moon Beams – Bill Evans
Moon River and Other Great Movie Themes – Andy Williams
More Cole Español – Nat King Cole
Mr. Broadway – Tony Bennett
The Music Man (OST) – Various Artists
My Bonnie – Tony Sheridan
My Son, the Folk Singer – Allan Sherman
Nancy Wilson/Cannonball Adderley – Nancy Wilson and Cannonball Adderley
Nat King Cole Sings/George Shearing Plays – Nat King Cole and the George Shearing Quintet
Nina at the Village Gate – Nina Simone
Nina Simone Sings Ellington – Nina Simone
No Strings – La Vern Baker, Chris Connor, Bobby Short
Oh! Look at Me Now – Bobby Darin
On Stage with the George Mitchell Minstrels – George Mitchell Minstrels
On the Way Up – Ann-Margret
Out of the Shadows – The Shadows
Past Midnight – Margaret Whiting
Patti Page Sings Golden Hits of the Boys – Patti Page
Peter, Paul and Mary – Peter, Paul and Mary
A Picture of You – Joe Brown
Poema de Amor – Elis Regina
Point of No Return – Frank Sinatra
Porgy and Bess – Original Soundtrack
Pot Luck – Elvis Presley
Ramblin' Rose – Nat King Cole
Rapture – Johnny Mathis
The Real Ambassadors – Dave Brubeck, Louis Armstrong, Carmen McRae, and Lambert, Hendricks & Ross
Rock 'N' Roll No.2 – Elvis Presley (re-issue)
Romantic Italian Songs – Sergio Franchi
Rhythm Is My Business – Ella Fitzgerald
S Wonderful 'S Marvellous – Ray Conniff
Sacred Songs – Harry Secombe
Sammy Davis Jr. All-Star Spectacular – Sammy Davis, Jr.
Sammy Davis Jr. Belts the Best of Broadway – Sammy Davis, Jr.
Sarah + 2 – Sarah Vaughan
See See Rider – La Vern Baker
Sentimentally Yours – Patsy Cline
The Shirelles and King Curtis Give a Twist Party – The Shirelles and King Curtis
Side by Side – Sandler & Young
Sinatra and Strings – Frank Sinatra
Sinatra and Swingin' Brass – Frank Sinatra
Sinatra Sings Great Songs from Great Britain – Frank Sinatra
Sinatra Sings of Love and Things – Frank Sinatra
Sinatra–Basie: An Historic Musical First – Frank Sinatra and Count Basie
Sincerely Yours – Robert Goulet
Sing Something Simple – Cliff Adams Singers
Something Warm – Oscar Peterson
The Song Is Paris – Jackie Paris
Sophisticated Lady – Julie London
Soul – Timi Yuro
The Sound of Johnny Cash – Johnny Cash
Strange Enchantment – Vic Damone
Sugar 'n' Spice – Peggy Lee
Surfin' Safari – The Beach Boys
Swinging All the Way with Frances Faye – Frances Faye
Take Good Care of My Baby – Bobby Vee
Takin' Off – Herbie Hancock
Time for 2 – Anita O'Day and Cal Tjader
Tears and Laughter – Dinah Washington
The Tender, the Moving, the Swinging Aretha Franklin – Aretha Franklin
Things and Other Things – Bobby Darin
32 Minutes and 17 Seconds – Cliff Richard and The Shadows
This Is Anita – Anita O'Day
This Was My Love – Jack Jones
Tijuana Moods – Charles Mingus
Time for Two – Anita O'Day and Cal Tjader
Tony Bennett at Carnegie Hall – Tony Bennett
Tope Puestro – Jorge Cafrune
Tops with Me – Helen Shapiro
Trumpet and Strings – Al Hirt
Twangy Guitar – Silky Strings – Duane Eddy
Twist with Chubby Checker – Chubby Checker
Twist with Keely Smith – Keely Smith
Twistin' and Twangin'  – Duane Eddy
Twistin' Knights at the Roundtable – Bill Haley & His Comets
Twistin' the Night Away – Sam Cooke
Two of Us – Robert Goulet
Vamp of the Roaring Twenties – Dorothy Provine
The Vivacious One – Ann-Margret
Warm and Willing – Andy Williams
We Wish You a Merry Christmas – Ray Conniff
West Side Story – Oscar Peterson Trio
What Kind of Fool Am I and Other Show-Stoppers – Sammy Davis Jr.
What Kind of Fool Am I? – Keely Smith
Whispering Hope – Jo Stafford and Gordon MacRae
You'll Never Walk Alone – Doris Day
You're Mine You – Sarah Vaughan

Biggest hit singles
The following singles achieved the highest chart positions in 1962.

Singles released

Published popular music
 "Ahab the Arab" w.m. Ray Stevens
 "Blowin' in the Wind" w.m. Bob Dylan
 "Bossa Nova Baby" w.m. Jerry Leiber & Mike Stoller
 "The Boys' Night Out" w. Sammy Cahn m. Jimmy Van Heusen from the film Boys' Night Out
 "Breaking Up Is Hard To Do" w.m. Neil Sedaka & Howard Greenfield
 "Call Me Irresponsible" w. Sammy Cahn m. Jimmy Van Heusen from the film Papa's Delicate Condition
 "Can't Get Used to Losing You" w.m. Doc Pomus & Mort Shuman
 "Can't Help Falling in Love" w.m. Luigi Creatore, Hugo Peretti & George David Weiss
 "Comedy Tonight" w.m. Stephen Sondheim
 "Danke Schoen" w. Milton Gabler & Kurt Schwabach m. Bert Kaempfert
 "Days of Wine and Roses" w. Johnny Mercer m. Henry Mancini from the film Days of Wine and Roses
 "Desafinado" w. Newton Mendonca m. Antonio Carlos Jobim
 "Devil Woman" w.m. Marty Robbins
 "Don't Make Me Over" w. Hal David m. Burt Bacharach
 "Dream Baby" w.m. Cindy Walker
 "Free" w.m. Stephen Sondheim
 "Go Away, Little Girl" w.m. Gerry Goffin & Carole King
 "Gonna Build A Mountain" w.m. Leslie Bricusse & Anthony Newley from the musical Stop The World – I Want To Get Off
 "The Good Life" w. (Fr) Jean Broussolle (as "La Belle Vie") (Eng) Jack Reardon w. Sacha Distel
 "Have A Dream" w.Lee Adams m. Charles Strouse
 "He's a Rebel" w.m. Gene Pitney
 "Her Royal Majesty" w.m. Gerry Goffin & Carole King
 "I Just Don't Know What to Do with Myself" w. Hal David m. Burt Bacharach
 "I'm Calm" w.m. Stephen Sondheim
 "I'm Not The Marrying Kind" w. Mack David m. Sherman Edwards
 "I've Got Your Number" w. Carolyn Leigh m. Cy Coleman. Introduced in the musical Little Me by Swen Swenson and Virginia Martin.
 "Impossible" w.m. Stephen Sondheim
"It's The Only Way To Travel" w. Sammy Cahn m. Jimmy Van Heusen. Introduced by Bing Crosby and Bob Hope in the film The Road to Hong Kong
 "Johnny Get Angry" w. Hal David m. Sherman Edwards
"Let's Not Be Sensible" w. Sammy Cahn m. Jimmy Van Heusen. Introduced by Bing Crosby and Dorothy Lamour in the film The Road to Hong Kong
 "Little Boxes" w.m. Malvina Reynolds
 "Loads of Love" w.m. Richard Rodgers. Introduced by Diahann Carroll in the musical No Strings
 "Look No Further" w.m. Richard Rodgers. Introduced by Diahann Carroll and Richard Kiley in the musical No Strings
 "Love I Hear" w.m. Stephen Sondheim
 "Lovely" w.m. Stephen Sondheim
 "Make It Easy On Yourself" w. Hal David m. Burt Bacharach
 "The Man Who Shot Liberty Valance" w. Hal David m. Burt Bacharach
 "More" w. Marcello Ciorciolini & Norman Newell m. Nino Oliviero & Riz Ortolani from the film Mondo Cane
 "On The Other Side Of The Tracks" w. Carolyn Leigh m. Cy Coleman from the musical Little Me
 "Once in a Lifetime" w.m. Leslie Bricusse & Anthony Newley from the musical Stop the World – I Want to Get Off
"Once Upon a Time" w. Lee Adams m. Charles Strouse. Introduced by Ray Bolger and Eileen Herlie in the musical All American
 "One Note Samba" w. Jon Hendricks & Newton Mendonca m. Antonio Carlos Jobim
 "Only Love Can Break a Heart" w. Hal David m. Burt Bacharach
 "Patches" w.and m Barry Mann and Larry Kolber
 "Pretty Little Picture" w.m. Stephen Sondheim
 "Quando, quando, quando" w. Pat Boone & Alberto Testa m. Elio Cesari
 "Ramblin' Rose" w.m. Noel Sherman & Joe Sherman
 "Real Live Girl" w. Carolyn Leigh m. Cy Coleman. Introduced by Sid Caesar in the musical Little Me.
 "The Road to Hong Kong" w. Sammy Cahn m. Jimmy Van Heusen from the film The Road to Hong Kong
 "The Stripper" m. David Rose
 "The Sweetest Sounds" w.m. Richard Rodgers from the musical No Strings
 "A Swingin' Safari" m. Bert Kaempfert
 "Teamwork" w. Sammy Cahn m. Jimmy Van Heusen. Introduced by Bing Crosby, Bob Hope and Joan Collins in the film The Road to Hong Kong
 "Those Lazy, Hazy, Crazy Days Of Summer" w. Charles Tobias m. Hans Carste
 "Vacation" w.m. Connie Francis, Hank Hunter & Gary Weston
 "A Walk in the Black Forest" m. Horst Jankowski
 "Walk on the Wild Side" w. Mack David m. Elmer Bernstein from the film Walk on the Wild Side
"Warmer Than a Whisper" w. Sammy Cahn m. Jimmy Van Heusen. Introduced by Dorothy Lamour in the film The Road to Hong Kong
 "What Kind of Fool Am I?" w.m. Leslie Bricusse & Anthony Newley. Introduced by Anthony Newley in the musical Stop The World – I Want To Get Off
 "What Now, My Love?" w. Pierre Delanoë & Carl Sigman m. Gilbert Bécaud
 "Wolverton Mountain" w.m. Merle Kilgore & Claude King

Other notable songs
"Danke Schoen" w. Kurt Schwaback and Milt Gabler m. Bert Kaempfert
"The Girl from Ipanema" ("Garota de Ipanema") w. Vinicius de Moraes m. Antonio Carlos Jobim
"Quando, quando, quando" w. Alberto Testa m. Tony Renis
"Mandulinata blu" – Mario Trevi
"" w.  m.

Classical music

Premieres

Compositions
George Barati – Chamber Concerto
Carlos Chávez – Symphony No. 6
Aaron Copland – Connotations
George Crumb – Five Pieces for piano
Luigi Dallapiccola
 for orchestra
 for baritone and chamber orchestra
Mario Davidovsky
Electronic Study No. 2
Synchronisms No. 1 for flute and electronic sound
Trio for Clarinet, Trumpet, and Viola
Ding Shande – Long March Symphony
Paavo Heininen – Second Symphony ("Petite symphonie joyeuse")
György Ligeti – Poème symphonique
Francis Jackson – Intrada for organ, Op. 84 No. 6
André Jolivet – Concerto for cello n°1
Wojciech Kilar – Riff 62 for symphony orchestra
Darius Milhaud
A Frenchman in New York
Invocation à l'ange Raphael
Overture Philharmonique
Symphony No. 12 Rurale
Krzysztof Penderecki – Stabat Mater
Francis Poulenc
Sonata for Oboe
Sonata for Clarinet
William Schuman – Symphony No. 8
Dmitri Shostakovich – Symphony No. 13 in B-flat minor, Op. 113 "Babi-Yar"
Ezra Sims – Third Quartet
La Monte Young – The Second Dream of the High-Tension Line Stepdown Transformer

Opera
Mozart Camargo Guarnieri – Um homem só (tragic opera in one act, libretto by Gianfrancesco Guarnieri, premiered on November 29 at the Theatro Municipal in Rio de Janeiro)
Mario Castelnuovo-Tedesco – The Importance of Being Earnest
Carlisle Floyd – The Passion of Jonathan Wade
Michael Tippett – King Priam
Bruno Maderna – Don Perlimplin (ovvero il Trionfo dell'amore e dell'immaginazione)

Jazz

Musical theatre
 All-American Broadway production opened at the Winter Garden Theatre and ran for 80 performances
 Blitz! (Lionel Bart) – London production
 A Funny Thing Happened on the Way to the Forum (Stephen Sondheim) – Broadway production opened at the Alvin Theatre and ran for 964 performances
 Gentlemen Prefer Blondes London production
 The Golden Apple Off-Broadway revival of 1954 Broadway production
 I Can Get It for You Wholesale Broadway production opened at the Shubert Theatre and ran for 300 performances
 Little Mary Sunshine London production
 Little Me Broadway production opened at the Lunt-Fontanne Theatre on November 17 and ran for 257 performances
 No Strings Broadway production opened at the 54th Street Theater on March 15 and ran for 580 performances
 Stop the World – I Want to Get Off (Anthony Newley and Leslie Bricusse) – Broadway production

Musical films
 Bees Saal Baad, starring Biswajeet
 Billy Rose's Jumbo released December 6 starring Doris Day, Jimmy Durante, Stephen Boyd and Martha Raye
 Gypsy starring Rosalind Russell, Natalie Wood and Karl Malden. Directed by Mervyn LeRoy.
 The Music Man starring Robert Preston, Shirley Jones and Hermione Gingold. Directed by Morton DaCosta.
 The Road to Hong Kong
 State Fair
 Wild Guitar

Births
January 4
Robin Guthrie (The Cocteau Twins)
Peter Steele (Type O Negative)
January 8 – Chris Marion, American musician (Little River Band)
January 13 – Trace Adkins, American country music singer-songwriter
January 15 – Tony Rebel, reggae/dancehall artist
January 16 – Paul Webb (Talk Talk)
January 22 – Jimmy Herring, American guitarist
January 28 – Leslie Phillips/Sam Phillips, singer
January 31 – Sophie Muller, British music video director
February 1 – Tomoyasu Hotei, Japanese guitarist (Boøwy)
February 4 – Clint Black, American singer-songwriter, guitarist and producer
February 5 – Martin Nievera, Filipino singer and TV personality
February 6 – Axl Rose (Guns N' Roses, LA Guns, AC/DC)
February 7
David Bryan, keyboardist for the band Bon Jovi
Garth Brooks, country singer
February 10 – Cliff Burton, bassist for Metallica (died 1986)
February 11 – Sheryl Crow, American singer
February 17 – David McComb, Australian singer-songwriter and guitarist (The Triffids and The Blackeyed Susans) (died 1999)
February 19 – Francisco Alejandro Gutierrez, singer
February 21 – Mark Arm, born Mark McLaughlin, American grunge vocalist (Mudhoney)
February 22
Olivier Latry, French organist
Michael Wilton, American progressive metal guitarist Queensrÿche
February 24 – Michelle Shocked, American musician
March 2 – Jon Bon Jovi, lead singer for the band Bon Jovi
March 5 – Craig Reid and Charlie Reid, The Proclaimers
March 7 – Taylor Dayne, American singer
March 10 – Gary Clark (musician), Scottish singer-songwriter, music producer (The Veronicas, Delta Goodrem, Reece Mastin, Gin Wigmore)
March 15 – Terence Trent D'Arby, American-born English singer
March 17 – Clare Grogan, Scottish actress and singer
March 24
Angèle Dubeau, Canadian violinist
Renee Rosnes, Canadian jazz pianist/composer
Rita, Israeli pop singer and actress
March 30 – M.C. Hammer, American rapper
March 31 – Phil Leadbetter, American musician
April 3 – Mike Ness (Social Distortion)
April 8 – Izzy Stradlin of Guns N' Roses, Ju Ju Hounds
April 12
Art Alexakis, American singer and musician (Everclear)
Michael English, American Christian singer
April 13 – Hillel Slovak, American rock musician (Red Hot Chili Peppers) (died 1988)
April 16 – Ian MacKaye, lead singer of Minor Threat and Fugazi
May 2 — Alain Johannes, Musician and Producer. Eleven (band), Queens of the Stone Age, Them Crooked Vultures
May 9 – David Gahan, English singer (Depeche Mode)
May 12 – Brett Gurewitz (Bad Religion)
May 14
Ian Astbury, British rock singer (The Cult)
C.C. DeVille, American rock guitarist (Poison)
May 16 – Erwin Gutawa, Indonesian composer
May 28 – Brandon Cruz, American child actor and musician
May 31 – Corey Hart
June 8 – Nick Rhodes (Duran Duran)
June 10 – Wong Ka Kui, Hong Kong composer, songwriter, musician and singer (died 1993)
June 15 – Andrea Rost, Hungarian lyric soprano
June 16 – Femi Kuti, Nigerian saxophonist
June 19 – Paula Abdul, American pop vocalist
June 20 – Mark De Gli Antoni, Soul Coughing
June 21 – Viktor Tsoi, Soviet underground singer and songwriter (died 1990)
June 22 – Bobby Gillespie, Scottish musician (Primal Scream)
June 23
Chuck Billy, American singer-songwriter and guitarist (Testament and Dublin Death Patrol)
Steve Shelley, American musician (Sonic Youth and Crucifucks)
June 26 – Andrej Šeban, guitarist
June 27 – Michael Ball, British stage actor and singer
July 7 – Mark White, bassist (Spin Doctors)
July 8 – Joan Osborne, American singer
July 13 – Rhonda Vincent, American singer-songwriter and mandolin player
July 21 – Lee Aaron, Canadian rock and jazz singer
July 22
Steve Albini, guitarist
Martine St. Clair, Canadian singer and actress
July 26 – Mairéad Ní Mhaonaigh, Irish musician
July 27 – Karl Mueller (Soul Asylum) (died 2005)
July 29 – Lisa Ono, Japanese-Brazilian bossa nova singer
August 4 – Paul Reynolds (A Flock of Seagulls)
August 7 – Andrew Glover, composer
August 17 – Gilby Clarke, American rock musician (Guns N' Roses)
August 25 – Vivian Campbell, rock guitarist (Def Leppard)
September 26 – Tracey Thorn, English singer, songwriter and writer
October 3 – Tommy Lee, drummer (Mötley Crüe)
October 5 – Ken Noda, concert pianist and composer
October 12 – Chris Botti, jazz trumpeter
October 15 – Mark Reznicek, alternative rock drummer (Toadies)
October 16
Flea, American-Australian actor and rock bassist (Red Hot Chili Peppers)
Dmitri Hvorostovsky, operatic baritone (died 2017)
October 25 – Chad Smith, rock drummer (Red Hot Chili Peppers)
November 1
Magne Furuholmen, Norwegian rock keyboardist (a-ha)
Anthony Kiedis, American lead singer of Red Hot Chili Peppers
November 2
Ron McGovney, American rock bassist (Metallica)
Graham Waterhouse, English composer
November 3 – Marilyn, born Peter Robinson, pop vocalist
November 9 – Steve "Silk" Hurley, house-music producer and club DJ
November 11
Mic Michaeli, Swedish rock keyboardist (Europe)
James Morrison, Australian musician
November 12 – Brix Smith, American singer and guitarist (The Fall and The Adult Net)
November 18 – Kirk Hammett, lead guitarist of Metallica
November 20 – Peng Liyuan, Chinese folk singer and First Lady
November 21 – Steven Curtis Chapman, American Christian music singer-songwriter
November 27
Charlie Benante, Anthrax
Mike Bordin (Faith No More)
November 28 – Matt Cameron (Soundgarden, Pearl Jam)
December 4 – Vinnie Dombroski (Sponge)
December 5 – José Cura, Argentine tenor
December 6 - Ben Watt a British musician, singer, songwriter, author, DJ and radio presenter, best known as one half of the duo Everything but the Girl and Tracy  Thorn
December 8 – Marty Friedman (Megadeth)
December 25 – Francis Dunnery, Lead singer, It Bites
December 28 – Michel Petrucciani, French musician (died 1999)
December 31 – Jennifer Higdon, American composer

Deaths
January 29 – Fritz Kreisler, violinist, 86
February 5 – Jacques Ibert, composer, 71
February 7 – Roy Atwell, American actor, comedian and composer, 83
February 17 – Bruno Walter, conductor, 85
February 22 – Atila the Hun, calypso singer, 69
March 24 – Jean Goldkette, jazz musician, 69
April 10 – Stuart Sutcliffe, early member of The Beatles, 21
May 24 – Cloe Elmo, operatic contralto, 52
May 27 – Egon Petri, pianist, 81
June 12 – John Ireland, pianist and composer, 82
June 13 – Sir Eugene Aynsley Goossens, conductor, 69
June 15 – Alfred Cortot, pianist and conductor, 84
July 11 – René Maison, operatic tenor, 66
July 12 – Roger Wolfe Kahn, bandleader, 54 (heart attack)
July 25 – Christie MacDonald, actress and singer, 87
August 19 – Emilius Bangert, composer and organist, 79
September 6
Hanns Eisler, composer, 64
Dermot Troy, lyric tenor, 35 (heart attack)
October 6 – Solomon Linda, Zulu musician, 53
October 15 – Joseph Noyon, French organist and composer, 74
November 15 – Toscha Seidel, violinist, 62
November 19 – Clara Clemens, concert contralto, daughter of Mark Twain, 88
December 7 – Kirsten Flagstad, operatic soprano, 67
December 13 – Harry Barris, singer, composer and pianist, 57 (alcohol-related)
December 22 – Roy Palmer, jazz trombonist, 70
December 31 – Bella Alten, operatic soprano, 85
date unknown – Palladam Sanjiva Rao, flautist and Carnatic musician

Awards

Eurovision Song Contest
Eurovision Song Contest 1962: Un premier amour, sung by Isabelle Aubret for France (music by Claude-Henri Vic, text by Roland Stephane Valade)

Grammy Awards
Grammy Awards of 1962

Ivor Novello Awards
Best-Selling A-Side – The Tornados, "Telstar"
Tony Osborne

See also
List of Billboard Hot 100 number-one singles of 1962

References

 
20th century in music
Music by year